The World Military Cross Country Championships is an international biennial cross country running competition organised by the International Military Sports Council (CISM). The competition is typically held in late February or early March. First held in 1947, it was typically held on an annually basis, but since 2004 it has been held roughly every two years.

The championships has three races: the men's long race (roughly ), the men's short race (roughly ), and the women's race (roughly ). The competition attracts elite level long-distance runners who are members of their national military, with past winners including two-time world champion Saif Saaeed Shaheen, the 2008 Olympic champion Nancy Jebet Langat, and New York Marathon winner Jeļena Prokopčuka.

Past winners

Men

Women

See also

World Military Track & Field Championships

References

Cross country running competitions
Cross-country
Recurring sporting events established in 1947
Athletics team events